The 1996 FIFA World Player of the Year award was won by Ronaldo, the youngest player to ever win the award, aged 20. The ceremony took place at the Belem Cultural Centre in Lisbon, on January 20, 1997. For the first time a record of 120 national team coaches, based on the current FIFA Men's World Ranking were chosen to vote. It was organised by European Sports Media, Adidas and FIFA.

Results

References

See also

FIFA World Player of the Year
FIFA World Player of the Year